The Kentucky Home (also known as the Anderson Hotel) was a historic home in Miami, Florida. It was located at 1221 and 1227 Northeast 1st Avenue. On January 4, 1989, it was added to the U.S. National Register of Historic Places, but afterwards it was demolished.

References

External links
 Dade County listings at National Register of Historic Places
 Dade County listings at Florida's Office of Cultural and Historical Programs

Houses on the National Register of Historic Places in Florida
National Register of Historic Places in Miami
Houses in Miami